Planipapillus is a genus of velvet worms in the family Peripatopsidae, whose species are found in eastern Victoria and southern New South Wales, Australia. They are unique in that the males of this genus bear patches of reduced papillae on the head, posterior to the eyes; the generic name refers to this fact, and likewise they have been vernacularly referred to as lawn-headed onychophorans. All species in this genus are oviparous and have 15 pairs of oncopods (legs).

Species 
The genus was erected in 1996 by Amanda Reid to accomodate four contemporarily described species, of which P. taylori was designated the type species. In the year 2000 she described and assigned a further eight species to Planipapillus, producing the count of 12 species recognised today. These species are listed below:

 Planipapillus annae Reid, 2000
 Planipapillus berti Reid, 2000
 Planipapillus biacinaces Reid, 1996
 Planipapillus biacinoides Reid, 2000
 Planipapillus bulgensis Reid, 1996
 Planipapillus cyclus Reid, 2000
 Planipapillus gracilis Reid, 2000
 Planipapillus impacris Reid, 2000
 Planipapillus mundus Reid, 1996
 Planipapillus taylori Reid, 1996
 Planipapillus tectus Reid, 2000
 Planipapillus vittatus Reid, 2000

References 

Onychophorans of Australasia
Onychophoran genera
Taxa named by Amanda Reid (malacologist)